Sebastian Mai (born 10 December 1993) is a German professional footballer who plays as a centre-back for MSV Duisburg.

Career
Mai began his career with Dynamo Dresden, before joining Chemnitzer FC in 2013. He made his 3. Liga debut for the club in October 2013, as a substitute for Kolja Pusch in a 1–0 defeat to Wacker Burghausen. At the end of the 2013–14 season, he signed for FSV Zwickau, along with team-mate Toni Wachsmuth.

Mai rejoined Dynamo Dresden on a free transfer in the summer of 2020, signing a two-year contract with the club. In the summer of 2022, after being released by Dresden, he moved to MSV Duisburg.

Personal life
His father Lars (born 1970) was a member of the Supervisory Board of Dynamo Dresden from November 2013 to September 2017. His younger brother Lukas is also a footballer.

Career statistics

References

External links

1993 births
Living people
Footballers from Dresden
Association football defenders
German footballers
Dynamo Dresden II players
Chemnitzer FC players
FSV Zwickau players
SC Preußen Münster players
Hallescher FC players
Dynamo Dresden players
MSV Duisburg players
2. Bundesliga players
3. Liga players
Regionalliga players
21st-century German people